Ura may refer to:

Places
Ura, Anatolia, a port in Anatolia during the Late Bronze Age and Iron Age
Ura, Bhutan, a populated place in Bhutan
Ura, Estonia, village in Koonga Parish, Pärnu County, Estonia
Ura, Hungary, a village in the Northern Great Plain, Hungary
Ura, Russia, several rural localities in Russia

Rivers
Ura River, Estonia
Ura (Lena), a tributary of the Lena in Russia
Ura (Yula), a tributary of the Yula in Russia

Languages
Ura language (Papua New Guinea)
Ura language (Vanuatu)
Fungwa language (Nigeria)

People with the surname
, Japanese sumo wrestler
, Japanese rower

Other uses
United Red Army, a defunct Japanese revolutionary group
Uganda Revenue Authority, Uganda's revenue collection agency
United Reform Action, a parliamentary party in Montenegro
Ura, or uracil, one of the four nucleobases in the nucleic acid of RNA
Ura or "Hura" is the battle cry of the Russian Armed Forces
Urban Renewal Authority in Hong Kong
Urban Redevelopment Authority in Singapore

See also
URA (disambiguation)

Japanese-language surnames